Suphisellus grossus is a species of burrowing water beetle in the subfamily Noterinae. It was described by Sharp in 1882 and is found in Argentina, Brazil and Paraguay.

References

Suphisellus
Beetles described in 1882